The Yamaha FZ8 and FAZER8, also known as the FZ8N and FZ8S, are motorcycles produced since 2010 by Yamaha Motor Corporation for sale in the United States, Europe, Canada, Australia and New Zealand.
The FZ8 is a naked bike, while the virtually identical FAZER8 features a half fairing and ABS.
The FZ8 and FAZER8 replace the smaller capacity FZ6 and FZ6 FAZER, although  these continue to be sold in other markets.

Other differences from the FZ1 engine include a lighter crankshaft, smaller valves and revised camshaft profiles. The aluminium frame and swingarm are also taken from the FZ1.

The FZ8 has been discontinued in the United States after 2013.

Some UK reviewers have criticised the bikes for being expensive compared with rivals such as the Triumph Street Triple and Kawasaki Z750.

In 2013 the front suspension became adjustable.

References

External links
FZ8 at Yamaha Motorsports

FZ8
Standard motorcycles
Motorcycles introduced in 2010